José Longinos Ellauri Fernández (1789–1867) was a Uruguayan politician.

He was President of the Constituent Assembly of Uruguay in 1830. He also served as Foreign Minister in the same year.

His son José Eugenio Ellauri y Obes was President of Uruguay.

See also
 Politics of Uruguay
 List of political families#Uruguay

References

1789 births
1867 deaths
University of Charcas alumni
Foreign ministers of Uruguay
Colorado Party (Uruguay) politicians
Presidents of the Chamber of Representatives of Uruguay